Annemarie Gerg (born 14 June 1975) is a German former alpine skier who competed in the 2002 Winter Olympics and 2006 Winter Olympics. She is a cousin of fellow alpine skier and former Olympic and World Champion Hilde Gerg.

References

External links
 sports-reference.com

1975 births
Living people
German female alpine skiers
Olympic alpine skiers of Germany
Alpine skiers at the 2002 Winter Olympics
Alpine skiers at the 2006 Winter Olympics
People from Bad Tölz
Sportspeople from Upper Bavaria
21st-century German women